Fissicrambus albilineellus is a moth in the family Crambidae. It was described by Charles H. Fernald in 1893. It is found in North America, where it has been recorded from southern California.

The wingspan is about 24 mm. Adults are on wing from June to July.

References

Crambini
Moths described in 1893
Moths of North America